Microlunatus phosphovorus is the type species of the bacterial genus Microlunatus. It is Gram-positive and is notable for being a polyphosphate-accumulating bacterium. It is coccus-shaped, aerobic, chemoorganotrophic.

References

Further reading

External links
LPSN
Type strain of Microlunatus phosphovorus at BacDive -  the Bacterial Diversity Metadatabase

Propionibacteriales
Bacteria described in 1995